The Girl from U.N.C.L.E. is an American spy fiction TV series starring Stefanie Powers that aired on NBC for one season from September 13, 1966, to April 11, 1967. The series was a spin-off from The Man from U.N.C.L.E. and used the same theme music composed by Jerry Goldsmith, in a different arrangement by Dave Grusin.

Synopsis
The Girl from U.N.C.L.E. stars Powers as American U.N.C.L.E. agent April Dancer and Noel Harrison (son of Rex Harrison) as her British partner, Mark Slate. Leo G. Carroll plays their superior, Alexander Waverly. The character name "April Dancer" was suggested by James Bond creator Ian Fleming who was a consultant in the creation of the parent program shortly before his death.

The series was not as successful as its parent program and was cancelled after 29 episodes due to low ratings. Several crossover episodes were produced in conjunction with The Man from U.N.C.L.E.. The Man from U.N.C.L.E. episode “The Moonglow Affair” served as a backdoor pilot where the two main characters, April and Mark, were portrayed by Mary Ann Mobley and Norman Fell, respectively. In the Girl crossover episode "The Mother Muffin Affair", Napoleon Solo (Robert Vaughn) teamed up with April Dancer.

Similar to the later spy series Alias, April Dancer often went on undercover missions where she had to affect a foreign accent (Powers is fluent in several languages).  Her dance training was also put to good use in several episodes, particularly "The Mata Hari Affair" where Powers recreated the dance performed by Greta Garbo in the film Mata Hari (1931) and "The Drublegratz Affair", where April Dancer went undercover as a go-go dancer.

Another feature was the sometimes outlandish avant-garde outfits worn by Powers, intended to make her appear hip and modern. She was featured on the cover of TV Guide (December 31, 1966 – January 6, 1967), and the article on her mentions the show "... allocating roughly $1,000 an episode for stretch vinyl jackets and skirts, a bare-midriff harem-dancer outfit, miniskirts and the latest mod fashions from Swinging London's Carnaby Street."

The article also underscores the show's major flaw: "Unlike her fellow U.N.C.L.E. agents, the ladylike April is not required to kill the bad guys. Her feminine charms serve as the bait, while her partner Noel Harrison provides the fireworks. She does carry, however, a perfume atomizer that sprays gas, earrings and charm bracelets that explode, among other interesting gadgets."

In contrast to her female contemporaries in similar shows who were enthusiastic practitioners of martial arts, such as the lead character in Honey West and Emma Peel in The Avengers, the more demure conception of April Dancer weakened the character and often turned her into a helpless damsel-in-distress. April was often knocked unconscious by T.H.R.U.S.H. agents and also frequently kidnapped and left in some very perilous positions. Arming her with gimmicks and gadgets was not enough.

Additionally, the stories generally leaned toward parody, campy humor and cartoonish villains instead of replicating the more realistic action-suspense format of the progenitor series. This is largely due to the influence of the Batman series, which became an instant sensation in early 1966. During the 1966–1967 season, The Man from U.N.C.L.E. also suffered a decline in ratings due to a change in format designed to appeal to Batman fans.

Despite attempts at cross-promotion with its parent series — Harrison appeared as Slate in an episode of Man from U.N.C.L.E. while Robert Vaughn appeared as Napoleon Solo in an episode of Girl from U.N.C.L.E. — the show failed to build an audience and lasted only one season. According to The Man from U.N.C.L.E. Book by Jon Heitland, and commentary on the DVD release of the parent series, the failure of Girl from U.N.C.L.E. was considered a contributing factor in Mans mid-season cancellation in early 1968.

Cast
 Stefanie Powers as April Dancer
 Noel Harrison as Mark Slate
 Leo G. Carroll as Alexander Waverly; chief of U.N.C.L.E.
 Randy Kirby as Agent Randy Kovacs

Notable guest stars

 Ed Asner
 Joan Blondell
 Tom Bosley
 John Carradine
 Jack Cassidy
 Ellen Corby
 Wally Cox
 Yvonne De Carlo
 Dom DeLuise
 John Erwin
 Bernard Fox
 Stan Freberg
 Boris Karloff
 Fernando Lamas
 Peggy Lee
 Raymond Massey
 Luciana Paluzzi
 Lyn Peters
 Pernell Roberts
 Ruth Roman
 Gena Rowlands
 Ann Sothern
 Olan Soule
 Olive Sturgess
 Leslie Uggams
 Robert Vaughn
 Carol Wayne
 Michael Wilding

Episodes

Backdoor pilot (1966)
The backdoor pilot, titled "The Moonglow Affair", originally aired as 52nd episode (S02E23) of The Man from U.N.C.L.E. on February 25, 1966.

Season 1 (1966–1967)

Syndication

Beginning in 1968, reruns of all 29 episodes of The Girl from U.N.C.L.E., including 99 of 105 of its parent series, The Man from U.N.C.L.E., were combined into a 128-episode syndication package in the United States. Years later, a few more episodes were added to the package, rounding it out to 132.

Home media
On August 23, 2011, Warner Bros. released the complete series in two parts on DVD in Region 1 via their Warner Archive Collection.  The two 4-disc collections contain all 29 episodes of the series.
These are Manufacture-on-Demand (MOD) releases, available exclusively through Warner's online store and only in the United States.

Soundtrack
Jerry Goldsmith's theme for The Man from U.N.C.L.E. was adapted for the series by Dave Grusin in an energetic variation. Of the 29 episodes, eight had complete original scores and six were partial scores, with the rest being tracked by the previously written material.

Grusin wrote four complete scores ("The Dog-Gone Affair", "The Mother Muffin Affair", "The Mata Hari Affair" and "The Furnace Flats Affair"), Richard Shores — who would be the principal composer for The Man from U.N.C.L.E the following season — wrote three ("The Montori Device Affair," "The Prisoner of Zalamar Affair" and "The Danish Blue Affair") and Jack Marshall composed his only score for either U.N.C.L.E. series with "The Horns-of-the-Dilemma Affair". Jeff Alexander, also writing his only U.N.C.L.E. music, provided a partial score for "The Garden of Evil Affair", sharing "Music Score by" credit with Grusin and Shores, the latter two sharing the credit on all the other episodes, tracked and partial score alike. The opening and closing title themes and suites from the episodes "The Dog-Gone Affair", "The Prisoner of Zalamar Affair", "The Mother Muffin Affair", "The Mata Hari Affair", "The Montori Device Affair" and "The Horns-of-the-Dilemma Affair" are included on the third FSM album of music from The Man from U.N.C.L.E.

Original novels

The Girl from U.N.C.L.E. was featured in five original novels, only two of which were published in the United States:
The Birds of a Feather Affair by Michael Avallone
The Blazing Affair by Michael Avallone
The Global Globules Affair — Simon Latter (published in United Kingdom, and in France as L'affaire des Globules)
The Golden Boats of Taradata Affair — Simon Latter (published in United Kingdom only)
The Cornish Pixie Affair — Peter Leslie (published in United Kingdom only)

Unlike the series, the novels were quite serious, with the plot of The Birds of a Feather Affair ending in tragedy for April when the "innocent" character usually featured in the TV show dies, despite what April does to stop the villains. In addition, the prohibition on April using deadly force on the TV series (described earlier) did not apply to the novels.

A Girl from U.N.C.L.E. digest magazine was also briefly published, which included novellas not published elsewhere. Gold Key Comics also published a short-lived, five-issue comic book.

References

External links
 
 Television Obscurities – The Girl from U.N.C.L.E.

1966 American television series debuts
1967 American television series endings
American action television series
Edgar Award-winning works
Espionage television series
Gold Key Comics titles
Television shows adapted into comics
NBC original programming
Television series by MGM Television
American television spin-offs
The Man from U.N.C.L.E.